Sea Devils is a 1931 American pre-Code drama film directed by Joseph Levering and starring Molly O'Day, Edmund Burns and Walter Long.

Cast
 Molly O'Day as Ann McCall 
 Edmund Burns as Richard Charters 
 Walter Long a Johnson the First Mate 
 Paul Panzer as Steve the Radio Operator 
 Henry Otto as Governor 
 Jules Cowles as Attorney

References

Bibliography
 Darby, William. Masters of Lens and Light: A Checklist of Major Cinematographers and Their Feature Films. Scarecrow Press, 1991.

External links
 

1931 films
1931 drama films
American drama films
Films directed by Joseph Levering
1930s English-language films
1930s American films